Miguel Uribe (born 1 January 1995) is a Colombian footballer who plays as a goalkeeper for Greenville Triumph SC in USL League One.

Career

College
Uribe began playing college soccer at Graceland University in 2015, before transferring to Southern Wesleyan University in 2016, where he stayed for three seasons.

Professional
On 28 February 2019, Uribe signed for USL League One side Greenville Triumph SC ahead of their inaugural season.

References

External links
 
 Profile at SWU

1995 births
Living people
Association football goalkeepers
Greenville Triumph SC players
Colombian footballers
Colombian expatriate sportspeople in the United States
Colombian expatriate footballers
USL League One players
Footballers from Bogotá